Harry Shuler Dent Jr. (born May 12, 1953) is an American financial newsletter writer. His 2009 book, The Great Depression Ahead, appeared on the New York Times Bestseller List.

Biography 
Dent, born in Columbia, South Carolina, is the son of politician Harry S. Dent Sr.

Dent is the founder of HS Dent Investment Management, an investment firm based in Tampa, Florida that advises, and markets, the Dent Strategic Portfolio Fund mutual fund. Dent is also the president and founder of the Dent Research and director of H.S. Dent Publishing.

Dent writes and markets an economic newsletter that reviews the economy in the US and around the world by focusing on generational consumer spending patterns, as well as financial markets. He has written eleven books, two recent ones being bestsellers. His most recent book, The Sale of a Lifetime, was released in September 2016.

The basis of Dent's investment thesis, spending wave theory, is that consumer spending related to the generational formation of families has a profound effect on the market value of investments such as financial securities, real estate, and gold.  Dent's spending wave theory posits that young adults spend little within the greater economy, and spending increases while they rear children. It peaks as children leave home and then slows during the last 15 years of working life (48–63). According to Dent, the decreased spending patterns of the current generation of US baby boomers entering retirement will cause a pronounced downturn in the greater macroeconomy and an associated decline in the value of financial markets.

Dent resides in San Juan, Puerto Rico.

Forecasts and performance 

 In Japan, Dent was using their peak of 45- to 50-year-olds (1990–1994) as the beginning of a long slowdown.  In the US, he used, and continues to use, the peak year for 48-year-olds, 2009, as the top of a long term growth pattern.
 Launched in June 1999, AIM Dent Demographics Fund had significant first year gains. Its subsequent performance was lackluster, however, and in July 2005, it was merged into another AIM offering.
 His 2011 book goes on to suggest consumer spending will begin to plummet in 2012 with the Dow bottoming out somewhere between 3,000 and 5,600 in 2014. After hitting bottom, stocks will experience a mini-rally in 2015–2017 before falling into a final bottom during the 2019–2023 period, when the 45–50 age group troughs because the U.S. birth rate reached its own low in 1973.
 In 2012 the "Dent Tactical Advantage ETF," symbol DENT, was de-listed having consistently under-performed the market for three years while at the same time charging an egregiously high 1.65% management fee.
 In 2012, he began writing weekly articles for the free investment newsletter Survive & prosper, now known as: Economy & Markets, which offers investment advice guided by his belief that a major economic crash is inevitable and that it will drop the DOW all the way to 3,300. As of early 2013, he has amended his predictions slightly to an expectation that the financial crash will begin between the end of 2013 and the first half of 2014.
 In 2013, Dent predicted the market would crash again in the Summer of 2013 and would take a further year and a half to recover.
 In 2014, while promoting his book The Demographic Cliff in Australia, he predicted a major Australian housing market correction beginning in 2014 after an even bigger one in China. He also predicted that the price of gold would fall to USD$700 an ounce, and has since revised this prediction to 2017.
 On December 10, 2016, Dent predicted that the Dow Jones Industrial average could fall 17,000 points as a result of Donald Trump's election win. Less than two weeks later, Dent reversed his opinion and thinks there is short term growth for the US stock market, but demographic forces will keep the economic growth stagnant in the longer term.

Criticism 
 According to Gene Epstein of Barron's Magazine, "Harry S. Dent Jr. knows how to sell books. But whether his stock-market strategies make sense—or money for investors—is another question."
 Jeffrey M. Laderman suggests in a Bloomberg Businessweek article that, "Harry's explanation of the stock market is a simple one that resonates with investors"..."But is it too simple to explain something as complex as the stock market and the economy?"
 Larry Swedroe, writing for CBS Money Watch asks, "Why do people listen to Harry Dent in light of his obvious inability to accurately predict the future?"
 Marketwatch Columnist Chuck Jaffe opines that, tell "people what they want to hear, and they will flock to your door."

Bibliography 
 Zero Hour: Turn the Greatest Political and Financial Upheaval in Modern History to Your Advantage (2017)
 The Sale of a Lifetime: How the Great Bubble Bust of 2017 Can Make You Rich (2016)
 The Demographic Cliff: How to Survive and Prosper During the Great Deflation of 2014–2019 (2014)
 The Great Crash Ahead (2011)
 The Great Depression Ahead (2009)
 The Next Great Bubble Boom (2006)
 The Roaring 2000s Investor (1999)
 The Roaring 2000s (1998)
 The Great Jobs Ahead (1995)
 The Great Boom Ahead (1993)
 Our Power to Predict (1989)

References

External links 
 Economy & Markets
 Dent Research
 The Sale of a Lifetime

American finance and investment writers
University of South Carolina alumni
Harvard Business School alumni
Living people
1953 births
Exchange-traded funds
Writers from Columbia, South Carolina
People from San Juan, Puerto Rico